Gülkız Ürbül (1901–1990) was a Turkish woman who became the first female muhtar (village chief) in Turkey in 1933. She later on changed her name to Gül Esin Aydın.

Background
Up to 1930, women had no political rights in Turkey. Beginning in 1930, they gained suffrage in local elections by Act no. 1580, dated 3 April 1930. Three years later, by Act no. 2349, dated 26 October 1933, the eligibility for the post of muhtar was also included in suffrage.

Two weeks later, Ürbül was elected the muhtar in Demircidere village of the Çine ilçe (district) in Aydın Province, marking the first time a woman was elected a political office in Turkey. (The village of Demircidere was later declared a district named Karpuzlu.)

Election and service term
In the 1930s, Gülkız Ürbül was one of the few literate village women in Turkey. During the First World War and Turkish War of Independence, she had lost her husband and five of her six brothers. In the election campaign, she ran against seven male candidates and won the muhtar election. During her short term, she initiated the construction of a road between her village and Çine and founded a cooperative to build a village room. She also banned gambling.

Feedbacks
After the election, Mehmet Ali Bey, the governor of Çine, said that the district was proud to be the pioneer in having the first female muhtar in Turkey. Recep Peker, the secretary-general of the Republican People's Party (and later prime minister from 1946 to 1947), sent a telegram and congratulated Ürbül on becoming the first Turkish female muhtar and political officeholder.

Death and legacy
Ürbül spent the last 20 years of her life in the Nazilli district of Aydın Province, where she died on the 18 December 1990. In 2011, the municipality of Aydın erected a bust of Gülkız.

See also
 Women in Turkish politics
 Müfide İlhan

References

1901 births
1990 deaths
Karpuzlu District
People from Çine
Local politicians in Turkey
20th-century Turkish women politicians